The City That Sleeps is the debut studio album by alternative rock band A Silent Film.  First released in the UK, it was followed up with a US version two years later containing two alternate tracks for American audiences.

Release and reception
The City That Sleeps was received with mixed critical acclaim. The original UK version of the album, produced by Sam Williams, contains 11 tracks, including their single "You Will Leave a Mark." This single was number one in the Sunday Times Culture magazine's 'Hottest Downloads' chart. The album was compared to the music of bands such as Coldplay and reviewers described it as 'catchy and accessible.'  It is this comparison that saddled the band with the piano rock label.

After the album's release the band toured, visiting places such as Portugal where they quickly became popular. After a matter of weeks, "You Will Leave A Mark" reached the top of the Portuguese download singles charts, followed by the album soon after.

In advance of the US release, the alternative rock music station Alt Nation on SiriusXM Satellite Radio began to play "You Will Leave A Mark" in April 2010.  The song soon made it onto the station's Alt 18 Most Requested Song Countdown, debuting on the 5/1/2010 Countdown at #14. It would ultimately reach #1 and remain on the Countdown for 30 weeks, making it the longest running song to chart.  This honor would be held until Foster the People's "Pumped Up Kicks" eventually surpassed it.

The band toured the US in September and December 2010, then performed almost daily from March 10 through April 8, 2011 in support of the album.  The latter run was as support for Civil Twilight.  In July, A Silent Film did a mini-tour of the West Coast. New material was presented at these shows which would ultimately wind up on the band's sophomore release, Sand & Snow.  These included: "Cuckoo Song," "Harbour Lights," and "Let Them Feel Your Heartbeat."  "Snowbirds" (later named "Where Snowbirds Have Flown") was also showcased, but would be a non LP b-side to the album's lead single, "Danny, Dakota and the Wishing Well," and would later appear on the deluxe edition of Sand & Snow.

Track listing

UK release (2008)
 Sleeping Pills
 Julie June
 Thirteen Times the Strength
 One Wrong Door
 Lamp Light
 Gerontion
 Feather White
 You Will Leave A Mark
 Highest Regard
 Ghosts in the Water
 Aurora

US re-release (2010)
 Driven By Their Beating Hearts
 Sleeping Pills
 You Will Leave A Mark
 Thirteen Times The Strength
 Julie June
 One Wrong Door
 Firefly At My Window
 Lamplight
 Feather White
 Aurora

Personnel

A Silent Film
Robert Stevenson
Lewis Jones
Ali Hussain
Spencer Walker

Additional personnel
Richard Haines - engineering
Jamie Hyatt - engineering
Tim Turan - mastering
Sam Williams - engineering, mixing, producer

References

2008 albums
A Silent Film albums